"It's Raining Men" is a song by the American musical duo the Weather Girls from their third studio album, Success (1983). It was released as the album's lead single on September 10, 1982, through Columbia Records and CBS Records International. Paul Jabara wrote the song in collaboration with Paul Shaffer, and produced the song in collaboration with Bob Esty. "It's Raining Men" is a Hi-NRG and post-disco song that incorporates elements of R&B, soul, and 1970s-style electronic dance music. Its lyrics describe an excitement and enjoyment of many different types of men.

"It's Raining Men" was a number-one dance hit in the United States, and reached the top ten in various other countries worldwide. VH1 listed the song as one of the Greatest Songs of the 1980s as well as one of the Greatest Songs of the 2000s decade. At the 26th Annual Grammy Awards (1983), "It's Raining Men" received a nomination for Best R&B Performance by a Duo or Group with Vocals.

Development and production

Paul Jabara and Paul Shaffer wrote the song over the course of one afternoon in 1979, intending it for Donna Summer, who had scored a hit with "Last Dance" (1978). However, as Shaffer later recalled, Summer had recently become a born-again Christian and rejected the song as "blasphemous". The song was then offered to Diana Ross, Cher, and Barbra Streisand, all of whom declined it.

In 1982, the song was offered to the Two Tons (formerly known as Two Tons o Fun). Wash and Armstead of the Two Tons also dismissed the song. Wash recounted "We thought it was a crazy song — in fact, too crazy to record. I kept saying, 'It's raining men? Really? Are you kidding me?'... I just did not think people would buy it... That's why I kept saying no." The duo eventually recorded the song in ninety minutes after Jabara persistently pleaded with them to record the song. The Waters Sisters (Julia Waters-Tillman and Maxine Waters-Willard), Stephanie Spruill, and Zenobia Conkerite performed background vocals on the chorus of the song.

Music

According to the sheet music published at Musicnotes.com by Alfred Music Publishing, "It's Raining Men" is a Hi-NRG and disco song, composed in the key of F minor. It incorporates R&B, soul, and 1970s-style electronic dance music. The song's tempo is a moderate beats per minute, in common time. Wash sang the lead vocals in the song. Wash's vocal range spans around two octaves in the song, from the low note of F3 to the high note of F5. "It's Raining Men" uses one minor chord, F minor, with the rest of the notes in major chords.

Release
"It's Raining Men" was first released to dance club DJs in the United States in mid-1982. The single was then released for 7" single and 12" single in the United States on September 10, 1982. Shortly after the release of the single, the Two Tons changed their name to the Weather Girls after much confusion by press and fans due to the duo introducing themselves as "the weather girls" in the introduction of the song. In 1993, a then-newly recorded version of "It's Raining Men" was released by the Weather Girls, now composed of Izora Armstead and her daughter Dynelle Rhodes, on their sixth album Double Tons of Fun (1993).

In 2005, a live version of the song was released on the Weather Girls' ninth album "Totally Wild!". This version features vocals by Dynelle Rhodes and then-newly added member Ingrid Arthur. In 2012, the same lineup of the Weather Girls released "It's Raining Men - 2012" (stylized as "It's Raining Men 2K12"). The song is based in the house music genre produced by Sebo Reed.

Impact and legacy

VH1 ranked the song at thirty-five on their list of the 100 Greatest Dance Songs in 2000, and also at thirty-five in their 100 Greatest One-Hit Wonders of the 1980s in 2009. Paste Magazine ranked the song twelve in their list of the 60 Best Dancefloor Classics in February 2017. Rolling Stone listed it number 90 in their ranking of The 100 Greatest Debut Singles of All Time in 2020 and number 88 in their list of 200 Greatest Dance Songs of All Time in 2022.

"It's Raining Men" has often been perceived as a gay anthem. A campaign was launched on Facebook on January 19, 2014, to get the song to UK number one in response to a UKIP councillor blaming recent UK floods and adverse weather on divine retribution for the British government's introduction of gay marriage. The campaign was reported widely by some press, and the Weather Girls' version reached number 21 on the first day of the chart week. The song re-entered the UK Singles Chart in 2014 at number 31. In 2017, Rolling Stone included the song on their 25 Essential LGBTQ Pride Songs list. In 2018, Billboard ranked the song at number forty-seven on their 50 Best Gay Anthems Of All Time list. The Gay UK ranked the song at number two on their Top 40 Gay Anthems for Pride list. And Time Out ranked it number nineteen in their list of The 50 Best Gay Songs to Celebrate Pride All Year Long in 2022.

In 1983, "It's Raining Men" was nominated for a Grammy Award in the category Best R&B Performance By A Duo Or Group With Vocal. In June 2017, "It's Raining Men" entered on the Spotify Rewind charts and peaked at number one.

Commercial performance
"It's Raining Men" was a commercial success in the United States. The song spent a total of eleven weeks on [[Billboard (magazine)|''Billboards]] Hot 100, ultimately peaking at forty-six on March 5, 1983. Although it hadn't yet been released to retail stores, the single gained much attention based on heavy rotation alone. On the chart dated December 24, 1982, "It's Raining Men" reached number one on the Billboard Dance chart and  held the top position for a total of two weeks. The song spent a total of twenty-two weeks on the Dance chart. After eighteen weeks on the R&B charts, "It Raining Men" peaked at number thirty-four. The song was also a huge success in the United Kingdom. The song peaked at number two on the UK Singles Chart, and became certified Gold status for sales exceeding 400,000 copies in the United Kingdom.

Music video
Production
The music video for "It's Raining Men", released in the winter of 1982, was directed by Gary Keys and filmed in an abandoned building in New York City. Due to limited support from Columbia Records, "It's Raining Men" was a low-budget video. Wash described the video's conception: "God, that was a cheesy video! We filmed it in an abandoned building [in NYC] in the dead of winter. There was no heat and everybody was wearing [winter] coats. That part in the video where we fall out of the sky, well, we landed on these mattresses and found out [the next day] they were infested with bugs. For days afterwards Izora and I were scratching [ourselves]! It was awful!"

Synopsis
The opening sequence of the video features the Weather Girls in a news station. The duo give a forecast prediction that it will rain men from the sky. After looking out of the station window to see the sky raining men, the Weather Girls leap out of the window with their umbrellas to join the men. Several dancers are seen in the music video performing choreography. Another scene features the Weather Girls wearing lingerie on a heart-shaped bed surrounded by and being adored by men. The closing scene shows the duo performing with the male dancers and extras in the music video.

Track listings and formats

Personnel
Izora Armstead, Martha Wash – lead vocals
Bob Esty – keyboards, synthesizer
Greg Mathieson – piano
Paul Delph – synthesizer
Lee Sklar – bass guitar
Michael Landau – guitar
Carlos Vega – drums
Stephanie Spruill, Julia Waters-Tillman, Maxine Waters-Willard, Zenobia Conkerite – background vocals

Charts

Weekly charts

Certifications

Martha Wash and RuPaul version

"It's Raining Men" was covered by Weather Girls' member Martha Wash and American drag queen and singer RuPaul in 1998. The song was retitled "It's Raining Men... The Sequel", and released as the lead single for Wash's compilation album The Collection (1998). The song was also released on RuPaul's Go-Go Box Classics (1998).

Critical reception
Larry Flick from Billboard wrote that Wash "sounds like she's having a blast as she revisits a hit from her heyday as half of the Weather Girls." He noted that "the novel hook of this new recording is the appearance of RuPaul, whose freewheeling vamps are saucy good fun." He also added that Producer Gary "Headman" Haas "doesn't deviate far from the original recording's disco sound, leaving a posse of remixers to investigate a variety of more trendy ideas."

Music video
The opening sequence of the accompanying music video for "It's Raining Men... The Sequel" features Martha Wash and RuPaul as the news anchors of the Weather Center. The duo give a forecast prediction that it will rain men from the sky, with several field reporters also reporting similar information. Wash, as a meteorologist and weatherwoman, performs the song in front of a digital map. Several people from around the world start to feel the effects of the forecast and some women are even shown collecting men that fall from the sky into baskets. Several men also appear in the music video, dancing to the song.

Track listings and formats

Charts"It's Raining Men... The Sequel"Geri Halliwell version

"It's Raining Men" was released on April 30, 2001, as the first single from British singer Geri Halliwell's second solo album, Scream if You Wanna Go Faster (2001). It was also featured as the lead single internationally to the soundtrack of the 2001 film Bridget Jones's Diary. The single became Halliwell's fourth consecutive number-one hit single on the UK Singles Chart and became her most successful solo single to date. "Feels Like Sex", another song from the album, was originally slated as the lead single, but after "It's Raining Men" was offered to Halliwell, the song was released as the first single, and was added to Scream if You Wanna Go Faster.

Background
Halliwell commented: "It was really odd because I was all ready to go with my new album. I had the single, I had the video idea all ready and then the producers of the movie said to me, 'do you want to record It's Raining Men for the soundtrack?' I thought it would be fun and I love Bridget Jones cos I've read both books and so I just did it really quickly. They all loved it and wanted it to be a single and I thought it was a bit of a gift, so I released it".

Reception
Halliwell's version received positive reviews by music critics, experienced international success and hit the top ten in over two dozen countries around the world, going to number one in several of them. In the United Kingdom, "It's Raining Men" debuted at number-one on the UK Singles Chart and stayed there for two weeks. It became Halliwell's fourth consecutive number-one single in the UK, selling 155,000 units in its first week and 80,000 in its second week. Halliwell became the first solo British female artist to have four number-one singles in the United Kingdom, a record she held until 2014. Overall the single went on to sell 449,000 copies in Britain alone, becoming the 13th-best-seller of 2001 and Halliwell's most successful single worldwide.

The song was successful outside the United Kingdom. In Flemish Belgium, the song stayed at number one for four weeks and was the best-selling single of 2001. The single reached number one in France for five weeks, receiving a Diamond certification from the Syndicat National de l'Édition Phonographique (SNEP). With this song, Geri Halliwell won the International Song of the Year award at the 2002 NRJ Music Awards in France. The cover was also a major success in Walloon Belgium, Ireland, Italy, Poland, and Switzerland.

A remix of the song, The Almighty Mix from the Toshiba-EMI series Dance Mania, volume 20, was also featured in the 2002 Japanese video games, DDRMAX2 Dance Dance Revolution 7thMix and Dance Dance Revolution EXTREME. This version of the song was used as the theme song in the advertisements for New Talent Singing Awards Vancouver Audition 2003. In July 2006, the song entered at number 79 on the Mexican Digital Sales Chart, spending two weeks inside the Top 100.

Music video
Halliwell was inspired by the 1980 film Fame and by the 1983 film Flashdance for the video.

Live performances
To promote the single, Halliwell performed the song on Top of the Pops, Comet Awards 2001, Musica Sí, Big Brother Germany, Party in the Park, Live & Kicking, Loft Story, Pepsi Chart Russia, CD:UK and Tickled Pink. Halliwell also performed the song on The Return of the Spice Girls world tour as her solo number.

Track listings
These are the formats and track listings of major single releases of "It's Raining Men" by Geri Halliwell.

 UK and Europe CD1/International CD Maxi 
 "It's Raining Men" – 4:18  
 "I Was Made That Way" – 4:45
 "Brave New World" – 4:10
 "It's Raining Men" 

 UK and Europe CD2/Australian CD Maxi 
 "It's Raining Men" – 4:18  
 "It's Raining Men"  – 4:46
 "It's Raining Men"  – 3:46
 "It's Raining Men"  – 6:55

 European 2-track CD single 
 "It's Raining Men" – 4:18  
 "Brave New World" – 4:10

 Italian 12-inch single''' 
Side A
 "It's Raining Men" – 4:18  
 "It's Raining Men"  – 4:46

Side B
 "It's Raining Men"  – 3:46
 "It's Raining Men"  – 6:55

Official remixes
 Radio edit – 3:50
 Album version – 4:18
 Bold and Beautiful Glamour Mix (radio edit) – 4:46
 Bold and Beautiful Glamour Mix (extended) – 7:06
 Almighty Mix (radio edit) – 3:46
 Almighty Mix (extended) – 8:15
 D-Bop Tall and Blonde Mix (short edit) – 6:55
 D-Bop Tall and Blonde Mix (long version) – 8:09
 Dax Thunderstorm Mix – 7:28
 "It's Raining G's" (N.W.A) – 4:13

Charts and certifications

Weekly charts

Year-end charts

Certifications

Release history

Notes

See also
 Golconda

References

External links

1982 songs
1982 singles
1984 singles
1998 singles
2001 singles
2014 singles
CBS Records singles
Columbia Records singles
The Weather Girls songs
EMI Records singles
Geri Halliwell songs
Hi-NRG songs
Irish Singles Chart number-one singles
LGBT-related songs
Martha Wash songs
Number-one singles in Italy
Number-one singles in Scotland
Number-one singles in Spain
Rhino Records singles
RuPaul songs
SNEP Top Singles number-one singles
Songs about weather
Songs written by Paul Jabara
UK Singles Chart number-one singles
Ultratop 50 Singles (Flanders) number-one singles